Schönbuch is an almost completely wooded area south west of Stuttgart and part of the Southern German Escarpment Landscape (German: südwestdeutsches Schichtstufenland). In 1972 the centre zone of Schönbuch became the first nature park in Baden-Württemberg.

A geological trail is located in Schönbuch nature park at Kirnberg and was created in 1977 on the 500th anniversary of the Eberhard Karls University of Tübingen. Several panels explain the sediments of the Keuper highland (shale, marl and sandstone) and the development of the Kirnbach valley.
Today the 156 km² large reserve is referred to as Schönbuch whereas the original, more comprehensive area is usually called Schönbuch-Region.

Schönbuch nature park is an important recreational area of the Stuttgart Region, also because it is only intersected by relatively few roads.

Location
The Schönbuch is located in central Baden-Württemberg – approximately 25 km south of the city center of Stuttgart, about 15 km south west of Stuttgart Airport. It is also close to Reutlingen (south-east), the university city of Tübingen (south), Herrenberg (southwest) and Böblingen (northwest).

Transport
A commuter train called the Schönbuchbahn runs through Schönbuch, connecting Dettenhausen to Böblingen where it connects with the S-Bahn system.

See also 
 List of hills of the Schönbuch

Literature 

 
Forests and woodlands of Baden-Württemberg
Nature parks in Baden-Württemberg
Regions of Baden-Württemberg
Natural regions of the Swabian Keuper-Lias Plains